John Hyrcanus (Yōḥānān Hurqanōs) was a Hasmonean (Maccabean) leader and Jewish high priest of the 2nd century BCE (born 164 BCE, reigned from 134 BCE until his death in 104 BCE). In rabbinic literature he is often referred to as Yoḥanan Cohen Gadol, "John the High Priest".

Name
Josephus explains in The Jewish War that John was also known as "Hyrcanus", but does not explain the reason behind this name. The only other primary source, the Books of the Maccabees, never used this name with respect to John. The single occurrence of the name Hyrcanus in 2 Maccabees 3:11 refers to a man to whom some of the money in the Temple belonged during the c. 178 BCE visit of Heliodorus.

The reason for the name is disputed amongst biblical scholars, with a variety of reasons proposed:
 Familial origin in the region of Hyrcania on the Caspian Sea
 A Greek regnal name, which would have represented closer ties with the Hellenistic culture against which the Maccabees had revolted under Seleucid rule. However, the region of Hyrcania had been conquered by Mithridates I of Parthia in 141–139 BCE
 Given the name by the Seleucids after he fought in the region alongside Antiochus VII Sidetes against Phraates II of Parthia in 130–129 BCE, a campaign which resulted in the release of Antiochus' brother Demetrius II Nicator from captivity in Hyrcania

Life and work
He was the son of Simon Thassi and hence the nephew of Judas Maccabaeus, Jonathan Apphus and their siblings, whose story is told in the deuterocanonical books of 1 Maccabees and 2 Maccabees, in the Talmud, and in Josephus. John was not present at a banquet at which his father and his two brothers were murdered, by John's brother-in-law, Ptolemy, son of Abubus. He attained to his father's former offices, that of high priest and ethnarch (national leader)—but not king. Josephus said that John Hyrcanus had five sons but named only four in his histories: Judah Aristobulus I, Antigonus I, Alexander Jannai, and Absalom. It is this fifth brother who is said to have unsuccessfully sought the throne at the death of Aristobulus I.

Some sources name his fifth son Hezekiah, and make him father of Judas, grandfather of Eucharis of Magdala.

Siege of Jerusalem
During the first year of John Hyrcanus's reign, he faced a serious challenge to independent Judean rule from the Seleucid Empire. Antiochus VII Sidetes marched into Judea, pillaged the countryside and laid a year-long siege on Jerusalem. The prolonged siege caused Hyrcanus to remove any Judean from the city who could not assist with the defence effort (Antiquities 13.240). These refugees were not allowed to pass through Antiochus’ lines, becoming trapped in the middle of a chaotic siege. With a humanitarian crisis on his hands, Hyrcanus re-admitted his estranged Jerusalemites when the festival of Sukkot arrived. Afterwards, due to food shortages in Jerusalem, Hyrcanus negotiated a truce with Antiochus.

The terms of the truce consisted of three thousand talents of silver as payment for Antiochus, breaking down the walls of Jerusalem, Judean participation in the Seleucid war against the Parthians, and once again Judean recognition of Seleucid control (Antiquities 13.245). These terms were a harsh blow to Hyrcanus, who had to loot the tomb of David to pay the 3,000 talents (The Wars of the Jews I 2:5).

Under Seleucid control (133-128 BCE)
Following the Seleucid siege, Judea faced tough economic times which were magnified by taxes to the Seleucids enforced by Antiochus. Furthermore, Hyrcanus was forced to accompany Antiochus on his eastern campaign in 130 BCE. Hyrcanus probably functioned as the military commander of a Jewish company in the campaign. It is reported that Antiochus, out of consideration for the religion of his Jewish allies, at one point ordered a two days' halt of the entire army to allow them to avoid breaking the Sabbath and Festival of Weeks.

This enforced absence probably caused a loss of support for the inexperienced Hyrcanus among the Judean population. Judeans in the countryside were especially disillusioned with Hyrcanus after Antiochus’ army plundered their land. Furthermore, John Hyrcanus's driving out the non-military population of Jerusalem during the siege also probably caused resentment against him. The action of looting the Tomb of David violated his obligations as High Priest, which would have offended the religious leadership.

Therefore, at a very early point in his thirty-one year reign of Judea, Hyrcanus had lost the support of Judeans in various cultural sectors. The Jerusalemites, the countryside Judeans and the religious leadership probably doubted the future of Judea under Hyrcanus. However, in 128 BCE Antiochus VII was killed in battle against Parthia. What followed was an era of conquest led by Hyrcanus that marked the high point of Judea as the most significant power in the Levant.

Conquests

John Hyrcanus was able to take advantage of unrest in the Seleucid Empire to assert Judean independence and conquer new territories. In 130 BCE Demetrius II, the former Seleucid king, returned from exile in Hyrcania to take back control of his empire. However, transition of power made it difficult for Demetrius to assert control over Judea. Furthermore, the Seleucid Empire itself fell apart into smaller principalities. The Ituraeans of Lebanon, the Ammonites of the Transjordan, and the Arabian Nabateans represented independent principalities that broke away from Seleucid control. Hyrcanus was determined to take advantage of the dissipating Seleucid Empire to increase the Judean State.

Hyrcanus also raised a new mercenary army that strongly contrasted with the Judean forces that were defeated by Antiochus VII (Ant.13.249). The Judean population was probably still recovering from the attack of Antiochus, and therefore could not provide enough able men for a Hyrcanus-led army. John Hyrcanus's army was supported by the Judean State once again by funds that Hyrcanus removed from the Tomb of David.

Beginning in 113 BCE, Hyrcanus began an extensive military campaign against Samaria. Hyrcanus placed his sons Antigonus and Aristobulus in charge of the siege of Samaria. The Samaritans called for help and eventually received 6,000 troops from Antiochus IX Cyzicenus. Although the siege lasted for a long, difficult year, Hyrcanus was unwilling to give up. Ultimately, Samaria was overrun and totally destroyed. Cyzicenus' mercenary army was defeated and the city of Scythopolis seems to have been occupied by Hyrcanus as well. The inhabitants of Samaria were then put into slavery. Upon conquering the former Seleucid regions Hyrcanus embarked on a policy of forcing the non-Jewish populations to adopt Jewish customs.

John Hyrcanus's first conquest was an invasion of the Transjordan in 110 BCE. John Hyrcanus's mercenary army laid siege to the city of Medeba and took it after a six-month siege. After these victories, Hyrcanus went north towards Shechem and Mount Gerizim. The city of Shechem was reduced to a village and the Samaritan Temple on Mount Gerizim was destroyed. This military action against Shechem has been dated archaeologically around 111–110 BCE. Destroying the Samaritan Temple on Mount Gerizim helped ameliorate John Hyrcanus's status among religious elite and common Jews who detested any temple to Yahweh outside of Jerusalem.

Hyrcanus also initiated a military campaign against the Idumeans (Edomites). During this campaign Hyrcanus conquered Adora, Maresha and other Idumean towns (Ant.13.257). Hyrcanus then instituted forced conversions on the Idumeans to Judaism. This was an unprecedented move for a Judean ruler.

Economy, foreign relations, and religion

After the siege of Jerusalem, Hyrcanus faced a serious economic crisis in Judea, although the economic difficulties probably subsided after the death of Antiochus VII, since Hyrcanus no longer had to pay taxes or tributes to a weaker Seleucid Empire. The economic situation eventually improved enough for Hyrcanus to issue his own coinage (see below). On top of that, Hyrcanus initiated vital building projects in Judea. Hyrcanus re-built the walls destroyed by Antiochus. He also built a fortress north of the Temple called the Baris and possibly also the fortress Hyrcania.

Moreover, Hyrcanus sought for good relations with the surrounding Gentile powers, especially the growing Roman Republic. Two decrees were passed in the Roman Senate that established a treaty of friendship with Judea. Although it is difficult to specifically date these resolutions, they represent efforts made between Hyrcanus and Rome to maintain stable relations. Also, an embassy sent by Hyrcanus received Roman confirmation of Hasmonean independence. Hyrcanus was an excellent case of a ruler backed by Roman support.

In addition to Rome, Hyrcanus was able to maintain steady relations with Ptolemaic Egypt. This was probably made possible due to various Jews living in Egypt who had connections with the Ptolemaic Court (Ant. 13.284–287). Finally, the cities of Athens and Pergamon even showed honor to Hyrcanus in an effort to appease Rome.

Furthermore, the minting of coins by Hyrcanus demonstrates John Hyrcanus's willingness to delegate power. Sixty-three coins found near Bethlehem bear the inscription, “Yohanan the High Priest.” The reserve side of the coins contains the phrase, “The Assembly of the Jews.” This seems to suggest that during his reign, Hyrcanus was not an absolute ruler. Instead, Hyrcanus had to submit at times to an assembly of Jews that had a certain amount of minority power. The coins lack any depictions of animals or humans. This suggests that Hyrcanus strictly followed the Jewish prohibition against graven images. The coins also seem to suggest that Hyrcanus considered himself to be primarily the High Priest of Judea, and his rule of Judea was shared with the Assembly.

In Judea, religious issues were a core aspect of domestic policy. Josephus only reports one specific conflict between Hyrcanus and the Pharisees, who asked him to relinquish the position of High Priest (Ant. 13.288–296). After this falling-out, Hyrcanus sided with the rivals of the Pharisees, the Sadducees. However, elsewhere Josephus reports that the Pharisees did not grow to power until the reign of Queen Salome Alexandra (JW.1.110) The coins minted under Hyrcanus suggest that Hyrcanus did not have complete secular authority. Furthermore, this account may represent a piece of Pharisaic apologetics due to Josephus's Pharisaic background. Regardless, there were probably tensions because of the religious and secular leadership roles held by Hyrcanus.

Ultimately, one of the final acts of John Hyrcanus's life was an act that solved any kind of dispute over his role as High Priest and ethnarch. In the will of Hyrcanus, he provisioned for the division of the high priesthood from secular authority. John Hyrcanus's widow was given control of civil authority after his death, and his son Judas Aristobulus was given the role of High Priest. This action represented John Hyrcanus's willingness to compromise over the issue of secular and religious authority. (However, Aristobulus was not satisfied with this arrangement, so he cast his mother into prison and let her starve.)

Legacy
John Hyrcanus the High Priest is remembered in rabbinic literature as having made several outstanding enactments and deeds worthy of memorial, one of which being that he cancelled the requirement of saying the avowal mentioned in Deuteronomy 26:12–15 once in every three years, since he saw that in Israel they had ceased to separate the First Tithe in its proper manner and which, by making the avowal, and saying "I have hearkened to the voice of the Lord my God, and have done according to all that you have commanded me," he makes himself dishonest before his Maker and liable to God's wrath. In his days, the First Tithe, which was meant to be given unto the Levites, was given instead to the priests of Aaron's lineage, after Ezra had fined the Levites for not returning in full force to the Land of Israel. By not being able to give the First Tithe unto the Levites, as originally commanded by God, this made the avowal null and void. In addition, John Hyrcanus is remembered for having cancelled the reading of Psalm 44:23, formerly chanted daily by the Levites in the Temple precincts, and which words, "Awake! Why do you sleep, O Lord?, etc.", seemed inappropriate, as if they were imposing their own will over God's, or that God was actually sleeping. In similar fashion, the High Priest cancelled an ill-practice had by the people to cause bleeding near the eyes of sacrificial calves by beating their heads so as to stun them, prior to their being bound and slaughtered, since by beating the animal in such a way they ran the risk of causing a blemish in the animal's membrane lining its brain. To prevent this from happening, the High Priest made rings in the ground of the Temple court for helping to secure the animals before slaughter.

Before John Hyrcanus officiated as Israel's High Priest, the people had it as a practice to do manual work on the intermediate days of the Jewish holidays, and one could hear in Jerusalem the hammer pounding against the anvil. The High Priest passed an edict restricting such labours on those days, thinking it inappropriate to do servile work on the Hol ha-Moed, until after the Feast (Yom Tov). It had also been a custom in Israel, since the days that the Hasmoneans defeated the Grecians who prevented them from mentioning the name of God in heaven, to inscribe the name of God in their ordinary contracts, bills of sale and promissory notes. They would write, for example, "In the year such and such of Yohanan, the High Priest of the Most High God." But when the Sages of Israel became sensible of the fact that such ordinary contracts were often discarded in the rubbish after reimbursement, it was deemed improper to show disrespect to God's name by doing so. Therefore, on the 3rd day of the lunar month Tishri, the practice of writing God's name in ordinary contracts was cancelled altogether, while the date of such cancellation was declared a day of rejoicing, and inscribed in the Scroll of Fasting.

The Mishnah (Parah 3:4[5]) also relates that during the tenure of John Hyrcanus as High Priesthood, he had prepared the ashes of two Red heifers used in purifying those who had contracted corpse uncleanness.

In what is seen as yet another one of John Hyrcanus's accomplishments, during his days any commoner or rustic could be trusted in what concerns Demai-produce (that is, if a doubt arose over whether or not such produce bought from him had been correctly divested of its tithes), since even the common folk in Israel were careful to separate the Terumah-offering given to the priests. Still, such produce required its buyer to separate the First and Second Tithes. Some view this as also being a discredit unto the High Priest, seeing that the commoners refused to separate these latter tithes because of being intimidated by bullies, who took these tithes from the public treasuries by force, while John Hyrcanus refused to censure such bad conduct.

After all said and done, and after accomplishing many heroic feats, John Hyrcanus in the later years of his life, abandoned the sect of the Pharisees, and joined himself to the Sadducees. This prompted the famous rabbinic dictum: "Do not believe in yourself until your dying day." At his death, a monument was built in his honour and where his bones were interred. John's Monument was located in what was formerly outside the walls of the city, but in Josephus' time had been enclosed between the second and third walls of Jerusalem, and where the Romans had built a bank of earthworks to break into the newer third wall encompassing the upper city, directly opposite John's Monument.

See also
 Hasmonean coinage
 Hyrcanus II
 List of Hasmonean and Herodian rulers

Notes

References

External links
 

160s BC births
104 BC deaths
2nd-century BCE High Priests of Israel
2nd-century BC Hasmonean rulers
Edom
2nd-century BC biblical rulers
Year of birth unknown